Shotesham Common is a  biological Site of Special Scientific Interest south of Norwich in Norfolk.

This site consists of traditionally managed meadows with a variety of grassland types, ranging from permanently wet marshes on the valley bottom, where a stream runs through, to drier grassland on the slopes. There are several uncommon species of flora.

A public footpath goes through the common.

References

Sites of Special Scientific Interest in Norfolk
Shotesham